Aircrew survival weapon may refer to:

 M6 Aircrew Survival Weapon
 Armalite AR-5
 Armalite AR-7
 TP-82 Cosmonaut survival pistol
 Chiappa M6 Survival Gun